John Stopford may refer to:

 John Stopford (rugby league)
John Stopford, Baron Stopford of Fallowfield, British peer, physician and anatomist
John M. Stopford, British organisational theorist

See also
Stopford (surname)